Zoroides is a genus of spiders in the family Miturgidae. It was first described in 1924 by Berland. , it contains only one species, Zoroides dalmasi, found in New Caledonia.

References

Miturgidae
Monotypic Araneomorphae genera
Spiders of Oceania